"Since You Been Gone" is a song written by former Argent guitarist Russ Ballard and first released on his 1976 album Winning.  It was covered by Rainbow in 1979 and released as a single from their album Down to Earth.

Rainbow version

In 1979, "Since You Been Gone" was covered by Rainbow, who released it as the first single from their 1979 album Down to Earth with Graham Bonnet on lead vocals. It was a top 10 hit single in the United Kingdom, where it reached number 6. In the US, the song reached number 57. 
It was named the 82nd Best Hard Rock Song of All Time by VH1. The song was later featured in the second trailer to Guardians of the Galaxy Vol. 3, which premiered on February 12, 2023 during Super Bowl LVII.

Chart performance

Certifications

Other cover versions
In 1978, the Illinois rock band Head East recorded and released a cover version of the song on their 1978 eponymous album, reaching No. 46 on the Billboard Hot 100. Head East's version of this song was their highest charting single.
Alcatrazz, also fronted by Graham Bonnet, covered the song on the album Live Sentence with Yngwie Malmsteen on guitar, and yet another Bonnet-fronted outfit, Impellitteri, recorded it for their 1988 debut album Stand in Line.
Brian May of Queen performed the song live on the Back to the Light tour in 1993, and it appears on the Live at the Brixton Academy multi-format release.
Other cover versions include those by South African all-female band Clout on their 1978 album Substitute, a.k.a. Clout, and by former Runaways vocalist Cherie Currie as a duet with her sister Marie Currie on the 1980 album Messin' with the Boys.  Their version reached No. 95 on the Billboard Hot 100.

References

External links
 
 

1976 songs
1976 singles
1979 singles
Epic Records singles
Rainbow (rock band) songs
Songs written by Russ Ballard
Song recordings produced by Muff Winwood
Song recordings produced by Roger Glover
Polydor Records singles